Daniane Jawad (born April 14, 1986 in Khouribga) is a Moroccan footballer. He currently plays for Slätta SK in Sweden.

References

Player profile at HLSZ 

1986 births
Living people
People from Khouribga
Moroccan footballers
Association football midfielders
Moroccan expatriate footballers
Expatriate footballers in Italy
Moroccan expatriate sportspeople in Italy
Moroccan expatriate sportspeople in Romania
Expatriate footballers in Hungary
Expatriate footballers in Romania
Kaposvári Rákóczi FC players
Liga II players
CSM Deva players
Moroccan expatriate sportspeople in Hungary
U.S. Agropoli 1921 players
A.S.D. Mezzolara players